Ricardo Jesús Gallén García (12 March 1972), is a Spanish classical guitarist who has been active since the mid-1990s. He is currently a professor of guitar at the Hochschule für Musik Franz Liszt, Weimar, Germany.

Career
Gallén was born in Linares, Jaén, Spain in 1972. He started playing classical guitar at the age of four, performing in public just a year later. At the age of ten, he entered the Conservatory of Music in Cordoba, receiving his first formal music education by the Conservatory's director and founder Tomás Villajos Soler. He continued his studies at the Conservatories of Jaén, Cordoba, Madrid and Granada, studying under Professors Victor Valls, Miguel Barberá, Demetrio Ballesteros and Carmelo Martinez and at the same time he attended a number of master classes both in Spain and abroad. He studied guitar and ancient music at the Universities of Mozarteum University of Salzburg and Hochschule für Musik und Theater München, with the Masters Eliot Fisk, Christoph Eglhuber, Jürgen Hübscher and Joaquin Clerch. In 1999  he completed the Meisterklassendiplom  (Konzertexam) in the Hochschule für Musik und Theater München, under Joaquin Clerch.

During the years 2001–2006, he worked as a professor in Ramon Llull University, Spain (Escola Luthier). He became an assistant professor in the class of Eliot Fisk in the Mozarteum University of Salzburg (2004–2009). He also served as a professor at the University of Extremadura, Spain (2005–2013) and was a guest professor in the Conservatories, Superior de Música en Palma de Mallorca  and, Superior de Música de Aragón, Zaragoza, in Spain, during the years 2011–2013.  Since 2009, Ricardo Gallén is a professor in the Hochschule für Musik "Franz Liszt", Weimar, Germany.

Gallén has given numerous recitals all over the world, in solo performances, duets, or with orchestras, under the direction of well known conductors, such as Maximiano Valdes, En Shao, Juan Jose Mena, Monica Huggett, Leo Brouwer, Jordi Savall and Seirgiu Comisiona, in more than 30 countries throughout Europe and America, including Mexico, Chile, Argentina, Cuba, USA, Costa Rica, Brazil, Australia, New Zealand, Russia, Norway, Denmark, Finland, Egypt, Jordan, Lebanon and Israel, in important concert halls like the Royal Concertgebouw in Amsterdam, National National Auditorium of Music, in Madrid, L'Auditori and Palau de la Música Catalana in Barcelona, Shostakovich Hall in Saint Petersburg and Tchaikovsky Hall in Moscow.

Gallén has been a member of the jury in several International Guitar Competitions and has given a number of master classes in several countries including Austria, Germany, Poland, Israel, USA, Chile, Lebanon, Portugal, Mexico, Norway, Russia, Slovakia, France, Greece, Romania, Spain, Finland, France, Australia, and New Zealand.
 
His first album, was one of Naxos Records best-selling albums in 2001 and received sensational reviews in the specialized press. It was followed by five more albums published by Naxos, in which he performs music by Mauro Giuliani, Leo Brouwer, Toru Takemitsu, etc., as well as all of the concerts for guitar and orchestra by the Spanish Maestro Joaquin Rodrigo. In 2013 his double CD with the Bach Complete Lute Suites  was released with Sunnyside Records and in May 2014 his last CD, Fernando Sor – Guitar Sonatas was released, by Eudora Records.

He has also recorded for Radio and Television in various countries including Spain, Finland, Belgium, Romania, Germany, Cuba, Mexico, South Korea and Bulgaria.

Ricardo Gallén plays a classical guitar by Paco Santiago Marín  and a romantic guitar by Arnoldo García  with Savarez Alliance Strings.

Awards and recognition 
Gallén has participated in over twenty international guitar competitions, having won five first prize awards including: the 32nd Markneukirchen International Instrumental Competition (1997), the 14th Andrés Segovia International Classical Guitar Competition (1998), where he also got a Special Prize, the Fourth Alhambra International Guitar Competition (1998), the 33rd Francisco Tarrega International Guitar Contest (1999), where he also got the Special Audience Prize and the 11th International Guitar Competition (2002), where he also got five special prizes.

Discography
 Sor: Guitar Sonatas (Eudora)
 Bach: Complete Lute Works (Sunnyside)
 Tales · Diego Barber (Sunnyside)
 Giuliani: Variations (Naxos)
 Guitar Recital: Ricardo Gallen (Naxos)
 Regondi: Airs Varies / Reverie, Op. 19 / Mertz: Bardenklange, Op. 13 (Naxos)
 Rodrigo: Concierto de Aranjuez / Concierto Andaluz (Complete Orchestral Works, Vol. 2) (Naxos)
 Rodrigo Concierto Madrigal / Concierto para una Fiesta (Complete Orchestral Works, Vol. 5) (Naxos)
 Rodrigo: Joaquin Rodrigo – A Portrait (Naxos)
 Adagio Chillout (Naxos)
 Classical Chillout – The Essential Collection (Naxos)

Reviews
Steven Rings · American Record Guide, August 2001
"Gallen's playing is impressive and his interpretations sure-footed, evidence of a compelling new musical voice on the guitar scene."

Allan Clive Jones · Classical Guitar Magazine, December 2002
"Ricardo Gallén, who is an excellent musician, plays all this music idiomatically, and as though it posed absolutely no difficulties for him."

 Anthony Holden ·  The Observer, March 2003 
"Soloist Ricardo Gallen is outstanding on both, joined in the second by Joaquin Clerch for the quirky 10-movement piece ranging in mood from the pastoral to the passionate. As with Russians, it takes Spaniards to play Spanish music properly, and the Asturias Symphony rises eloquently to the task, filling the most urban sitting-room with those sweeping Spanish vistas."

 EarlyRomanticGuitar.com 
"Ricardo's playing is expertly crafted, with many subtleties of ornamentation and phrasing that will impress even the accomplished musician."

 Classical CD Reviews · July, 2002 · MusicWeb (UK) ·  Classical Editor: Rob Barnett · Founder Len Mullenger
"After his impressive first recording for Naxos, which consisted of mainly 20th century works, namely those of Leo Brouwer and Toru Takemitsu, Ricardo Gallén proves that he can turn his hand (or should that be "hands") to the classicism of the Viennese school of guitar players. He does so with this collection of variations by the immensely talented guitarist/composer Mauro Giuliani. Famous in his lifetime as a virtuoso guitarist, the music abounds in flights of virtuosic display but is not without its moments of sensitivity and wit, all of which Ricardo Gallén handles in a most stylish way..."

 John Duarte · Gramophone, July 2003
"A superbly entertaining Rodrigo cycle continues in fine, vital style...Gallén's performance certainly does it justice...this is a recording that can hold its own with any of the others - finely played with good sound on the part of all concerned, excellently balanced and faithfully recorded...The performances of all these 'fillers' are exemplary but it is the two large works that make this recording indispensable to Rodrigo lovers, who are being well served by this series."

 John Miller and SA-CD.net, May 2014
"Gallén's tone, adduced from his guitar (a copy of a Fabricatore circa 1820) is rich, varied and resonantly beautiful. In the upper voice he can change the timbre to a sharp-edged, penetrating tone or to a soft-edged, warm tone, the foundation of his expressive interpretation. In the lower voice his dynamic control is remarkable, changing the volume of accompaniments from loud to soft with innate skill. I was also very impressed with his ability to make complex polyphonic passages sound as if several instruments were playing. Even when playing fast, virtuosic passages, he makes a minimum of string whistles or fingerboard noises. He can, however, deliver fast, soft low note rows at the same time producing an underlying pecking noise on the guitar body, just as Sor wrote, and swelling fast-repeated deep notes as if an accompaniment by timpani. Very impressive - and he plays all the repeats, which in this case is a real benefit. […] My final words: a splendid set of performances which could almost be regarded as authoritative for the Sor sonatas, captured with startling realism in 5.0 high-resolution sound. Highly recommended."

 David Hurwitz · Classicstoday.com, May 2014
"Amazingly, though, this is very good music, and it’s extremely well played by Gallén. The Sonata Op. 25, which has four big movements (the first of them slow and brooding), manages to convey a remarkable degree of contrapuntal interest, and Gallén has the admirable ability to differentiate melody, accompaniment, and inner parts in such a way as to create layers of sonority that are consistently captivating."

 EarlyRomanticGuitar.com, May 2014
"While there are many recordings of Fernando Sor available, this one really stands out. […] Ricardo's playing sounds effortless and graceful, with elegant phrasing, stylistic concern, and in service of the music."

 Jean-Jacques Millo, Translation by Lawrence Schulman · Opus Haute Définition, June 2014
"Ricardo Gallén literally embraces these Sonatas in a musical flow of extreme sensibility, offering rare and precious nuances. Few recordings devoted to the guitar can claim to  such intelligent playing. The emotion is tangible, like a watermark on music that is a revelation. A warm sound recording that perfectly restitutes the medium and bass frequencies of the instrument, this SACD is a small miracle many will hold on to jealously."

 Remy Franck · Pizzicato.lu, June 2014
"Splendid performances of Fernando Sor’s four sonatas, recorded in a stunningly natural surround sound. Gallén’s playing is rhetoric, elegant and richly nuanced."

Dan Morgan · Musicweb International Classical Reviews, July 2014
"[...] Sor and Gallén both shine brightly; a treat, and not just for guitar fans either."

References 

Living people
Spanish classical guitarists
Spanish male guitarists
1972 births
People from Linares, Jaén
University of Salzburg alumni
Academic staff of the Hochschule für Musik Franz Liszt, Weimar
21st-century guitarists
21st-century male musicians
Naxos Records artists
Sunnyside Records artists